The 2022–23 AWIHL season is the 14th season of the Australian Women's Ice Hockey League (AWIHL). It runs from 5 November 2022 until 19 March 2023. Five teams compete in 30 regular season games followed by 4 playoff games, making up the AWIHL Finals weekend. The Sydney Sirens claimed the Joan McKowen Memorial Trophy championship title by winning the grand final. The Melbourne Ice claimed the Stephanie Boxall Trophy premiership title for finishing top of the regular season standings. The Sirens finished runner-up in the regular season and the Adelaide Rush claimed the wooden spoon.

Teams

In 2022–23 the AWIHL had five teams from five Australian state capital cities competing, stretching east to west of the continent.

League Business

The official AWIHL gameday schedule was released at the beginning of October 2022. The season structure remained unchanged from 2019-20, with each team playing two of the four opponents in a four game series with the other two teams being played twice during the season. Ahead of the new season, after a two year absence due to COVID-19 outbreaks and subsequent lockdown and travel restrictions, AWIHL Commissioner, Melissa Rulli, stepped down from her role. She held the position for almost five years, having secured the position in December 2017. The Brisbane Goannas announced they had signed and agreement with the Brisbane Lightning organisation to merge their organisations. The Goannas would re-brand themselves as the Lightning for the season ahead. At the end of October, the league and Cluch signed a broadcasting deal for every game of the season to be broadcast live and free on Cluch's streaming platform. The streams would be available worldwide, with no region locking. In January, Perth Inferno released a special one-off Cancer Awareness jersey that will be worn in a game on 4 February 2023 and then auctioned off post-game to support Cancer Council Western Australia.

Staffing changes for 2022-23 included Brisbane naming Tom Harkness as their new head coach, with Matt Meyer and Ben Stadtmiller to assist him. Adelaide appointed Joey MacDougall as their new head coach and the vastly experienced Jim Fuyarchuk as assistant coach. Melbourne Ice changed their coaching lineup for 2022-23. Rod Johns, Bryan Mackenzie and Andrew Marshall were appointed team coaches, replacing Marcus Wong, Mark Smith and Laurie Piggot.

Regular season

Fixtures & results
Running between 5 November 2022 and 5 March 2023, the AWIHL regular season consisted of 30 games in total, with teams playing 12 games each.

November

December

January

February

March

Key:

Standings

Player stats
The season's league leader statistics for skaters and goaltenders.

Season awards

Below lists the 2022–23 AWIHL regular season award winners.

Joan McKowen playoffs
The top four teams in the AWIHL regular season qualify for the Joan McKowen Memorial Trophy playoffs. The playoffs is held on a single weekend and uses Australian conventions of being called Finals. The playoff system used by the AWIHL is a four team single game semi-finals and grand final system where the semi-final winners progress to the grand final and the losers playoff for third place. Semi-finals are played on the Saturday and the third place playoff and grand final is played on the Sunday. The prize for being crowned AWIHL Champions for winning the grand final is the Joan McKowen Memorial Trophy.

In 2022–23, the Ice, Sirens, Lightning and Inferno qualified for the finals weekend. The event was held on 18-19 in host city Melbourne at O’Brien Icehouse.

Semi-finals

Third place playoff

Final

References

External links 
Australian Women's Hockey League
Ice Hockey Australia

Australian Women's Ice Hockey League seasons
Aust
ice hockey
ice hockey